Chakkere Puttamade Gowda Yogeshwara is an Indian Politician and Actor from the state of Karnataka who served as the Minister of Tourism, Environment and Ecology Department of Karnataka from 21 January 2021 to 26 July 2021. He is a member of the Karnataka Legislative Council and is a former member of the Karnataka Legislative Assembly representing the Channapatna constituency. He also worked in Kannada Film Industry (Sandalwood) in lead roles. His performance in Utthara Druvadind Dakshina Druvaku, Badhri, Kambalahalli, Preethi Nee Illade Na Hegirali and Sainika were praised. His last role was in the movie Attahasa as a cop, the film was based on the life of Veerappan.
He was nominated as MLC on 22/07/2020 from BJP.

Early life 
C.P. Yogeshwar was born on 29 August 1963 in Chakere village, Channapatna Taluk, Ramnagara Dist. in Karnataka.  He has completed his B.Sc. from V.V. Puram College, Bangalore in the year 1983–1986.

Ministry
He was the Minister for Forest in the B.S. Yeddyurappa led Karnataka Government.

External links 
 Karnataka Legislative Assembly

References 

 

1963 births
Living people
People from Ramanagara district
Bharatiya Janata Party politicians from Karnataka
Karnataka MLAs 1999–2004
Karnataka MLAs 2004–2007
Karnataka MLAs 2008–2013
Samajwadi Party politicians
Indian National Congress politicians